The Aruba national basketball team represents Aruba in international competitions. They have yet to appear in the FIBA AmeriCup.

It is managed by the Aruba Basketball Bond.

Competitive record

FIBA AmeriCup
yet to qualify

Caribbean Championship

1986-1996 : ?
1998-2000 : -
2002 : 8th
2004-15 : -

See also
Aruba national under-17 basketball team

References

External links 
Presentation at CaribbeanBasketball.com
Archived records of Aruba team participations
Aruban league on Latinbasket.com
Facebook presentation

Men's national basketball teams
Basketball
Basketball in Aruba
Basketball teams in Aruba
1986 establishments in Aruba